Ethmia ultima is a moth in the family Depressariidae. It is found in China, Mongolia and Russia (Tuva, Transbaikal).

In Mongolia, adults have been recorded in mid- and late June and in Tuva in mid-May.

References

Moths described in 1967
ultima